Cheraghabad Rural District is a rural district (dehestan) in the Tukahur District of Minab County, Hormozgan Province, Iran. At the 2006 census, its population (including Hasht Bandi, which was subsequently detached from the rural district and promoted to city status) was 18,281, in 3,831 families; excluding Hasht Bandi, the population (as of 2006) was 15,272, in 3,200 families.  The rural district has 22 villages.

References 

Rural Districts of Hormozgan Province
Minab County